María Ana "Bambi" Lammoglia Harper is a Filipino cultural writer and socialite who was a former President of the Heritage Conservation Society of the Philippines, and a columnist for the Philippine Daily Inquirer with  "Sense and Sensibility", which focuses on Philippine cultural history. In 2008, she became 7th Administrator of the historic Intramuros district of Manila.

Controversy 
In early September 2008, it was reported that administrative charges could be leveled against Harper for having allowed the cutting of 29 trees, including nine mahogany and flame trees at the Plaza de Roma fronting Manila Cathedral.

The Department of Environment and Natural Resources reported that Harper, as head of the Intramuros Administration, sought a permit in May 2008 to remove trees at the park so that the area could be landscaped and developed and to "replace [the trees] with historically appropriate trees which would not block the facade of Manila Cathedral."

Harper responded that she had not ordered the trees cut, but rather asked a contractor to move the trees to another part of the park. She said that a subordinate had mistakenly given approval for the trees to be cut.

Sources 

 
 

Filipino women writers
Year of birth missing (living people)
Living people
Philippine Daily Inquirer people